Michael Baxes (born December 18, 1930) is a former American professional baseball player. He played two seasons in Major League Baseball, primarily as a second baseman and shortstop, in 1956 and 1958 for the Kansas City Athletics. During his MLB career, he appeared in 146 games, registered 337 at bats, and collected 73 hits. His brother, Jim Baxes, was a major league second baseman and third baseman.

External links

1930 births
Living people
Major League Baseball shortstops
Major League Baseball second basemen
Kansas City Athletics players
Phoenix Senators players
San Francisco Seals (baseball) players
Yakima Bears players
Salt Lake City Bees players
Buffalo Bisons (minor league) players
Richmond Virginians (minor league) players
Vancouver Mounties players
Portland Beavers players
Tacoma Giants players
Baseball players from San Francisco
International League MVP award winners